Papa Roach: Live & Murderous in Chicago is the first DVD by Californian rock band Papa Roach. It was released in the United States on November 22, 2005 and features the band performing live at The Vic Theatre in Chicago, Illinois. Extras include all of the band's music videos from their career to date, a photo gallery, and a hidden easter egg. The DVD was produced and directed by Devin DeHaven through his company, FortressDVD. The concert has also been aired on HDNet.

Track listing
Introduction
Dead Cell
Not Listening
She Loves Me Not
M-80 (Explosive Energy Movement)
Getting Away with Murder
Be Free
Life Is a Bullet
Blood (Empty Promises)
Done With You
Harder Than a Coffin Nail
Blood Brothers
Born with Nothing, Die with Everything
Infest
Take Me
Scars
Broken Home
Cocaine (Queens of the Stone Age cover)
Last Resort
Between Angels and Insects
End Credits

Bonus material
Music videos
"Last Resort"
"Broken Home"
"Between Angels and Insects"
"She Loves Me Not"
"Time and Time Again"
"Getting Away with Murder"
"Scars"
Photo gallery
Easter egg (To find, go to the audio selection screen, highlight main menu, press left and then enter.)

Personnel
 Jacoby Shaddix - lead vocals
 Jerry Horton - lead guitar, backing vocals
 Tobin Esperance - bass guitar, backing vocals
 Dave Buckner - drums, percussion

References

Papa Roach albums
Concert films
2005 live albums
2005 video albums
Live video albums